Pothan Vava is a 2006 Malayalam film directed by Joshiy starring Mammootty and Usha Uthup. Famous Indian pop and bollywood singer Usha Uthup made her first screen appearance through this film. She played the role of Mammootty's mother. The film was released on October 21 coinciding with Diwali. Pothen Vava performed well and commercial success of Mammootty and decent year of movie

Plot
Pothen Vava tells the story of Vava, the son of Kurishuveettil Mariamma, a lawyer popularly known as Vakeelamma. In his village Palliyangadi, frequent clashes take place between the Vaddakkeyangadi group led by Kurishuveettil Mariamma and Vava, and the Thekkeyangadi group led by Pulikattil Vakkachan and his sons Anto and Paul. However, Vakkachan's youngest daughter Gladys, who had been a junior to Vakeelamma when the latter was a practicing lawyer, is now herself a lawyer and with the tacit approval of her father, stands by the Kurishuveettil family in all lawsuits.

Meanwhile, the usual clashes erupt between the two factions regarding the church festival. When Vava is selected to head the festivities for the year, the Thekkeyangadi group objects saying that Vava, born to a Christian Mother and a Brahmin father (Melpathoor Vishnu Narayanan Namboothiri, a singer), was never baptized, and so could not head the festivities. Following this objection Vava decides to get baptized, but Vakeelamma says that he must first seek his father's permission, though his father and mother had been divorced years ago.

Vava goes to see his father who is now a renowned singer. He is welcomed by his father's manager Sivankutty, Sivankutty's sister Gayathri and others. But there is someone who wants to see Vava dead. Sivan Kutty kills Namboothiri. Vava kills Sivan for revenge. So for the rituals Vava becomes Brahman. He gets arrested and his mother accidentally walks into the pyre and dies.

Soon after his prison sentence, the warring faction set their difference aside and invite Vava to head the church festivities . The films ends with Pulikattil Vakkachan accepting Vava as his son-in-law for he proved himself as a true human who reunited his parents irrespective of their religions .

Cast

Mammootty as Pothan Vava
Usha Uthup as Kurisuveettil Mariamma
Nedumudi Venu as Meppattor Vishnu Narayanan Nampoothiri
Gopika as Advocate Gladys
Bijukuttan as Mathai
Rajan P. Dev as Vakkachan
Spadikam George as Antochan
Maniyanpilla Raju as Paulachan
Sai Kumar as Sivankutty
Samvrutha Sunil as Gayathri
Kalasala Babu as Fr. Abraham
Biju Pappan as Thommichan
Augustine as Kurian
Kunchan as Panikkar
Baburaj as Michael
Ponnamma Babu
Nisha Sarang
Deepika Mohan
Narayanankutty
Lal as himself (Guest Appearance)

Music
The score and soundtrack of the movie was composed by Alex Paul, with lyrics penned by Vayalar Sarath Chandra Varma.
"Vave Makane" - Madhu Balakrishnan, Usha Uthup
"Vave Makane" - Afsal, Madhu Balakrishnan, Pradeep Palluruthy, Ramesh Babu
"Nerane Ellam Nerane" - Madhu Balakrishnan, Reju Joseph, Manjari
"Omkarathidambulla" - M. G. Sreekumar
"Manjadi Manimuth" - M. G. Sreekumar, Jyotsna
"Raga" (Bit) - Jyotsna, Chorus

Box office
The film was commercial success.

References

External links
 

Films directed by Joshiy
2000s Malayalam-language films